Art Hains is an American broadcaster in Springfield, Missouri, who serves as voice of the Missouri State Bears. His voice is also heard on the Kansas City Chiefs Radio Network.

He grew up in Marshall, MO and started work at KMMO Radio in Marshall while in high school.  He graduated from Southern Methodist University in Dallas, TX, majoring in broadcast journalism, and having worked in the SMU sports information office 1973–76.

Hains was sports director of KGBX Radio in Springfield, MO from 1977–81, serving as voice of the Southwest Missouri State Bears football/basketball teams.  From 1981-85 he worked on the sports staff at KRLD Radio in Dallas, TX, anchoring weekday sportscasts, hosting Dallas Cowboys pre-and post-game shows; play-by-play and color for SMU basketball and studio host for the Southwest Conference Football Radio Network 1982–84.

In 1985, he returned to Springfield, MO as coordinator of athletic promotions at Southwest Missouri State, resuming his duties as voice of the Bears.  From 1995–2008, he was sports director of Meyer Communications in Springfield, returning to the university in 2008 as licensing director in the Marketing & Communications Department. (SMSU became Missouri State in 2005).   Since May 1, 1995, he has hosted a daily afternoon radio show known as "Sports Talk" which first aired on KWTO and later KWTO-FM when it changed to a sports radio format (the show and format moved to KBFL (AM) and KBFL-FM on July 30, 2020 after an ownership change of the group of radio stations). Since 2008, he has served as studio host for the Chiefs Radio Network in Kansas City, including their Super Bowl victory in February, 2020.

Hains was inducted into the Springfield Area Sports Hall of Fame in 2003 and the Missouri Sports Hall of Fame in 2017.

References

Living people
American broadcasters
Missouri State Bears and Lady Bears
People from Springfield, Missouri
Year of birth missing (living people)